Ljubomir "Ljubiša" Spajić (7 March 1926 – 28 March 2004) was a Serbian footballer who was part of Yugoslavia national football team at the 1954 FIFA World Cup and the 1956 Summer Olympics. He later became a manager.

References

External links
 Profile at Serbian federation site

1926 births
2004 deaths
Footballers from Belgrade
Serbian footballers
Yugoslav footballers
Association football defenders
Red Star Belgrade footballers
OFK Beograd players
FK Budućnost Podgorica players
Yugoslav First League players
Yugoslavia international footballers
1954 FIFA World Cup players
Olympic footballers of Yugoslavia
Footballers at the 1956 Summer Olympics
Medalists at the 1956 Summer Olympics
Olympic silver medalists for Yugoslavia
Olympic medalists in football
Serbian football managers
Yugoslav football managers
Aris Thessaloniki F.C. managers
Turkey national football team managers
Beşiktaş J.K. managers
Olympiacos F.C. managers
Iraklis Thessaloniki F.C. managers
Panachaiki F.C. managers
Super League Greece managers
Süper Lig managers
Serbian expatriate football managers
Yugoslav expatriate football managers
Yugoslav expatriate sportspeople in Greece
Yugoslav expatriate sportspeople in Turkey
Expatriate football managers in Greece
Expatriate football managers in Turkey